The U.S. Department of Education Office of Inspector General (ED OIG) is an Inspector General office created by the Department of Education Organization Act. The Inspector General for the Department of Education is charged with investigating and auditing department programs to combat waste, fraud, and abuse.

History of Inspectors General

References 

Education Office of Inspector General, Department of
United States Department of Education
United States Department of Education agencies